Hiram Maristany (August 10, 1945 – March 10, 2022) was an American photographer. He was the director of El Museo del Barrio from 1974 to 1977. He was known for his association with, and documentation of, the Young Lords chapter in Harlem, which he co-founded in 1968. His work has been included in museums such as MoMA PS1 and he held a residency at the Metropolitan Museum of Art.

He had a son, Pablo, and a daughter, Alita. Maristany died on March 10, 2022, at the age of 76.

References 
 

1945 births
2022 deaths
American photographers